John Woodcock Graves (9 February 1795 – 17 August 1886) was a composer and author of "D'ye ken John Peel".

Life 
Graves was born in Wigton, Cumberland, England, the son of Joseph Graves, a plumber, glazier and ironmonger and his wife Ann, née Matthews. His father died when he was nine years old and he had comparatively little education. At 14 he began to work for an uncle in Cockermouth who was a house, sign, and coach painter, but he learnt little from him. He owed more to an old bachelor, Joseph Falder, a friend of John Dalton the scientist. Graves afterwards said of Falder "he fixed in me a love of truth, and bent my purpose to pursue it". Graves did some drawing, and at one time wished to study art, but his circumstances did not allow of this, and he became a woollen miller at Caldbeck. There he was friendly with John Peel (1776-1854), with whom he hunted. He was sitting in his parlour one evening with Peel when Graves's little daughter came in and said, "Father what do they say to what granny sings?" "Granny was singing to sleep my eldest son with a very old rant called 'Bonnie (or Cannie) Annie'. The pen and ink being on the table, the idea of writing a song to this old air forced itself upon me, and thus was produced, impromptu, 'D'ye ken John Peel with his coat so grey'. . . . I well remember saying in a joking style, 'By jove, Peel you'll be sung when we're both run to earth'."

Graves neglected his woollen mills and lost a court case concerning it. Graves left for Tasmania, and arrived at Hobart in 1833 with his wife and four children, and about £10 in his pocket. Except for a short period at Sydney he remained in Tasmania for the rest of his life. Graves was inventive and "brought to considerable perfection several machines--especially one for preparing the New Zealand flax". His fortunes varied but he was able to give his children a good education. His eldest son, his namesake, became a well-known Hobart barrister but died before his father, and another son in business in Hobart looked after him in his last days. Graves died at Hobart. He was married twice: firstly to Jane Atkinson and secondly to Abigail Porthouse. There were eight children of the second marriage, of whom at least one son and a daughter survived him. In 1958 a memorial to him was erected in St David's Park. Sidney Gilpin's The Songs and Ballads of Cumberland includes six poems by Graves.

For a while he was an inmate in Lachlan Park Hospital (later the Royal Derwent Hospital).

References

1795 births
1886 deaths
English composers
Australian people of English descent
People from Wigton
English male poets
19th-century English poets
19th-century English musicians
19th-century English male writers